The Drummoyne Devils is an Australian club water polo team that competes in the National Water Polo League.  They have a men's team and a women's team and are based in Drummoyne, New South Wales.

References

External links
 

Water polo clubs in Australia
Sporting clubs in Sydney
Sports clubs established in 1904
1904 establishments in Australia